is a railway station in Sasebo, Nagasaki, Japan. It is operated by Matsuura Railway and is located on the Nishi-Kyūshū Line.

Lines
The station is served by the Nishi-Kyūshū Line.

Station layout
The station is ground level with 2 side platforms and 2 tracks.

Environs
National Route 204
Ōno waiting place (Saihi Motor)
Sasebo City Office Ōno Branch
Sasebo-Nishi High School
Meganeiwa
Sasebo Municipal Ōno Junior High School
Sasebo-Kita Post Office
Norito Shrine

History
April 20, 1929 - Report the rename to present name.
October 1, 1936 - The Railroad Ministry nationalizes all railroads, this station becomes a station of the JGR Matsuura Line.
July 9, 1967 - Yunoki Line (from this station to Yunoki Station) becomes the whole line interruption by a flood.
September 1, 1967 - Yunoki Line is discontinued. 
April 1, 1987 - Railways privatize and this station is inherited by JR Kyushu.
April 1, 1988 - This station is inherited by Matsuura Railway.

Adjacent stations 

|-
|colspan=5 style="text-align: center;" |Matsuura Railway

References
Nagasaki statistical yearbook (Nagasaki prefectural office statistics section) (Japanese)

External links
Matsuura Railway (Japanese)

Railway stations in Japan opened in 1920
Railway stations in Nagasaki Prefecture
Sasebo